Frank Clarke (born 8 October 1936 in Cardiff, Glamorgan) is a former Welsh cricketer.  Clarke was a right-handed batsman who bowled right-arm fast-medium.

Clarke made his first-class debut for Glamorgan against the Combined Services at Cardiff Arms Park in 1956.  Clarke went on to make thirty further first-class appearances for the county, the last of which came against the touring South Africans in 1960.  Primarily a bowler, Clarke took 50 first-class wickets at an average of 37.36, with best figures of 5/66.  These figures were his only five wicket haul and came against Middlesex at Lord's in the 1959 County Championship.  With the bat, he scored a total of 98 runs at a batting average of 3.76, with a high score of 31.  This score, which came against the touring Indians in 1959, accounted for 32% of his entire career runs.  Injury forced Clarke to retire in the 1961 season.

References

External links
Frank Clarke at ESPNcricinfo
Frank Clarke at CricketArchive

1936 births
Living people
Cricketers from Cardiff
Welsh cricketers
Glamorgan cricketers